Cup massage is a type of massage based on the local impact on human body with rarefied air.  This method of therapy  through the use of decreased pressure is a type of vacuum therapy, widely used nowadays for treating a variety of human diseases. 

Cup massage is performed with medical cups, which have vacuum-sucking, thermochemical, and reflectory impact on the skin, hypoderm, muscles and nerves. 

Cup massage lasts 10 to 20 minutes and is accompanied with the feeling of warmth.  It can be slightly uncomfortable to the patient.  The skin in the massaged area becomes slightly hyperemic and congested.  Cup massage should be immediately stopped if the patient complains about the pain and discomfort and asks to stop it.

History of cup massage 
The history cup massage dates back thousands of years; thus, it was widely used in the times of ancient Roman empire. Galen, the well known Roman physician, applied cups onto patients’ skin after having done series of small cuts. Avicenna described the effectiveness of using cups for “curing bad blood”, which were popular in Arabic countries. Therapists of Ancient China used cups in combinations with acupuncture. In Russia, cup massage was often used to fight respiratory diseases and their consequences.

Application of cup massage 
Cup massage can be performed on almost all areas of human body.  Most often cup massage is used to massage back, chest, limbs, and even face.  Cup massage in the facial area is recommended after the paralysis of facial nerves and also with a cosmetic purpose. The procedure starts and ends with classical manual massage techniques.

Cup massage efficacy 
The effect of the cup massage resembles that of a tissue massage. Cup massage is very effective for eliminating stasis and improving blood and lymph circulation.

As a result of cup massage:

 systolic pressure decreases;
 pulse rate returns to normal;
 biochemical processes inside the body show positive changes;
 microcirculation of blood and lymph improves;
 metabolic processes become more active;
 overall state of patient's health improves;
 stasis is eliminated.

As a result of cup massage, extravasations often appear under the skin.  They are important, as they help the diagnostic process and show the patient's progress.

See also 
 Massage
 Types of massage
 Vibromassage
 Honey massage
 Cryomassage
 Hydro massage

References 

 V. Fokin, "The Complete Course of Massage", Types of Massage, 2003

Massage therapy